Philadelphus (? – 217) is referred to as the first bishop of Byzantium after the eight-year administration of the Church of Byzantium by a priest whose name has not been recorded. He was bishop for six years (211–217).

Sources
Οικουμενικό Πατριαρχείο

3rd-century people from Byzantium
Bishops of Byzantium